Sharjah to Sharjah is a 2001 Indian Malayalam-language comedy-drama film directed Venugopan and starring Jayaram, Jagadish and Aishwarya.

Plot
Unni is wrongly accused of murder of Kannan in Sharjah. Sheikh Jasim Khalid Al Mubarak Mehbali tells Unni's brother Nandagopal Viswanathan that he can release Unni if he can get a letter from Kannan's family that they have pardoned Unni and all the members of Kannan's family should sign the letter.

Nandagopalan goes to Kannan's house disguised as a Sheikh from Sharjah and trying to fool everyone in signing the letter without telling the truth of the contents of the letter.

Little does Nandan know that the Sheikh is trying to fool him as well as he has written something else in the letter.

How Nandan convinces Kannan's family to get the signatures and how he rescues Unni from the authorities and the evil Sheikh forms the rest of the story.

Cast

 Jayaram as Nandagopal Viswanathan
 Aishwarya as Kalyani
 M. N. Nambiar as Valiya Kappithan
 Madhu as  Justice Viswanathan Kartha
 Jagadish as Kuwait Kochunni
 Ibrahim Kutty as Sheikh Jasim Khalid Al Mubarak Mehbali
 Rajan P. Dev as Karunan Kappithan
 Captain Raju as Kanaran Kappithan
 Ramu as Kumaran Kappithan
 Maniyanpilla Raju as Sethu
 Vineeth Kumar as Kannan
 Ushakumari as Bhanu
 Sudheesh as Unnikrishnan Viswanathan
 Harisree Ashokan as Lohi
 Keerikkadan Jose
 Nadirshah
 Mamukkoya as Velayudhan
 Bindu Panicker
 Radhika as Ammukutty

Soundtrack
Music: Mohan Sitara, Lyrics: Girish Puthenchery

 "Chandana Thennalai" (F) - K. S. Chitra
 "Chandana Thennalai" (M) - K. J. Yesudas
 "Dee Dee" (Pathinalam Ravinte) (M) - M. G. Sreekumar
 "Dee Dee" (Pathinalam Ravinte) (F) - Smitha
 "Du Du" - M. G. Sreekumar
 "Iniyum" - Gayatri Asokan
 "Mam Manasa" - Radhika Thilak
 "Neelakayalil" - P. Jayachandran

References

External links
 

2000s Malayalam-language films
2001 action comedy films
2001 films
2001 comedy films
Indian action comedy films
Films shot in the United Arab Emirates
Films scored by Mohan Sithara